Gadag Assembly constituency is one of the 224 constituencies in the Karnataka Legislative Assembly, in India. It is also part of Haveri (Lok Sabha constituency).

Assembly Members
 1972 : P. K. Hanamantappa (INC)

Election results

1972 Election
 P. K. Hanamantappa (INC) : 29,638 votes 
 M. V. Rudrappa (NCO) : 22709

2018
Hanamantagouda Krishnagouda Patil	M	INC	77,699 votes defeated	Anil Mensinakai	M	BJP	75831

References

Assembly constituencies of Karnataka